Forest Hill is a village in Rapides Parish, Louisiana, United States. It is part of the Alexandria, Louisiana Metropolitan Statistical Area. The population was 818 at the 2010 census.

Geography
Forest Hill is located at  (31.043389, -92.530698).

Demographics

2020 census

As of the 2020 United States census, there were 605 people, 315 households, and 214 families residing in the village.

2010 census
As of the census of 2010, there were 813 people, 367 households, and 245 families residing in the village. The racial makeup of the village was 52.0% White, 3.52% African American, 0.44% Native American, 1.40% Asian, 6.36% from other races, and 1.68% from two or more races. Hispanic or Latino of any race were 42.98% of the population.

There were 167 households, out of which 35.3% had children under the age of 18 living with them, 65.3% were married couples living together, 7.2% had a female householder with no husband present, and 24.6% were non-families. 18.6% of all households were made up of individuals, and 7.8% had someone living alone who was 65 years of age or older. The average household size was 2.73 and the average family size was 3.13.

In the village, the population was spread out, with 24.8% under the age of 18, 10.5% from 18 to 24, 27.2% from 25 to 44, 24.6% from 45 to 64, and 12.9% who were 65 years of age or older. The median age was 34 years. For every 100 females, there were 97.4 males. For every 100 females age 18 and over, there were 101.8 males.

The median income for a household in the village was $36,667, and the median income for a family was $42,292. Males had a median income of $27,500 versus $16,875 for females. The per capita income for the village was $13,859. About 18.0% of families and 25.5% of the population were below the poverty line, including 18.5% of those under age 18 and 14.0% of those age 65 or over.

Arts and culture
Every year, during the third weekend of March, Forest Hill is home to the Louisiana Nursery Festival. It is the village's yearly attraction and brings in thousands of people each day to see the many floral, artistic, and amusement booths.

Forest Hill is home to over 60 plant nurseries, and is one of Louisiana's oldest and largest nursery regions. Businesses routinely visit Forest Hill to purchase wholesale plants.

Cajun Classic National Enduro
The Cajun Classic National Enduro is an enduro race that is held in the Calcasieu District in Kisatchie National Forest. The 29th Annual was held March 20, 2011. It was organized and run by the National Enduro Promotions Group and Acadiana Dirt Riders, Inc.

Speed Trap and Citations
The Village of Forest Hill is one of many municipalities that derives a majority of its revenue from fines and citations. Most of those citations are from the town being part of a speed trap. Forest hill has many entries about speed traps--many entries the approach on Highway 112 when nearing Highway 165 going westbound

Notable people

Robert W. Bates, agent of the United States Secret Service from 1965 to 1976
Jay Chevalier, singer and politician, born in Forest Hill in 1936
Clyde C. Holloway, Republican former U.S. representative from defunct Eighth Congressional District and current member of the Louisiana Public Service Commission.
Kimberly Willis Holt, children's author

References

Villages in Rapides Parish, Louisiana
Villages in Louisiana
Alexandria metropolitan area, Louisiana